The Alliance of Liberals and Democrats for Europe (ALDE; , ADLE) is a transnational alliance between two European political parties, the Alliance of Liberals and Democrats for Europe Party and the European Democratic Party. ALDE has political groups in the European Parliament, the EU Committee of the Regions, the Parliamentary Assembly of the Council of Europe and the NATO Parliamentary Assembly. There are assorted independents in these groups as well as national-level affiliate parties of the European-level parties.

The pro-European platform of ALDE espouses liberal economics, and support for European integration and the European single market.

European Parliament

Committee of the Regions

Foundation
Following the creation of the ALDE group in the European Parliament, which occurred half-way during the third mandate of the Committee of the Regions (CoR), the members of the ELDR Group in the CoR rapidly entered into talks with the CoR members belonging to the EDP Party with a view to replicating a similar arrangement within the CoR. Under the presidency of Kent Johansson, Executive Member of the Swedish Region of Västra Götaland, the ELDR Group of the Committee of the Regions unanimously agreed in February 2005 to change its name to the ALDE Group and to accept the EDP members to the group. In doing so, the group adopted a new Mission Statement (see below). The current President of the Group is Bart Somers, Mayor of Mechelen and leader of the liberal group in the Flemish Parliament.

Mission statement
The Alliance of Liberals and Democrats for Europe in the Committee of the Regions is committed to ensuring that the European Union develops legislation in as decentralised a manner as possible, communicating with and listening to Europe's citizens in a systematic way.

The main goals of the party are:

Institution
 Ensuring the Committee of the Regions continues its development as an effective institution of the EU, working with a clear purpose and vision, and bringing added value to the Union's institutional framework.
 Ensuring the  Committee maintains the highest standards of accountability, transparency, and efficiency, responding to the expectations of Europe's citizens and its local and regional authorities.

Citizen
 Ensuring CoR Opinions and activities respect and promote personal freedom and the self-fulfilment of each individual, as the best way to achieve a prosperous and fair society.
 Promoting the protection of minorities, and ensuring that CoR activities reflect the make up of Europe's society, involving citizens from all backgrounds, regardless of their ethnic background, gender, sexual orientation, faith, or age.
 Developing citizen ownership of the Union, by using the CoR's unique network of Members throughout the EU to communicate and consult with the citizen.
 Working with other EU institutions to promote greater labour mobility within the Union, by for example, relaying information to citizens about EU opportunities for personal and professional development.
 Promoting the development of multiple identities as a necessary foundation for a successful European Union.
 Ensuring the free exercise of regional identity.

Region
 Ensuring that the EU only takes decisions in those areas which are best dealt with at European level, that is to say, guaranteeing the suitable fulfilment of the Principle of subsidiarity.
 Working closely with the European Parliament, the Commission and the Council, to ensure that EU legislation includes the views of local and regional authorities.
 Promoting measures which enhance the ability of regions to contribute to Europe's economic growth and their ability to develop a fair and effective European social model.
 Working towards the development of new forms of collaboration between the different spheres of government in the EU, recognising where appropriate the specificities of those authorities with legislative powers and those without.

Union
 Ensuring that the heritage of cultures and identities of the peoples of Europe is not lost, and is used to support the development of multiple identities.
 Promoting simplified, accountable, and  fair European governance.
 Ensuring that CoR Opinions and activities promote sustainable development throughout the Union and the protection of Europe's environment.
 Promoting the development of decentralization and regionalization.
 Promoting competitiveness as a mean to achieve economic, social and territorial cohesion on a basis of solidarity and justice.
 Promoting European cultural and linguistic diversity.
 Actively pursuing real cross-border cooperation.

Non-member states
 Assist, where necessary and within the CoR's means, the development of democratically legitimate local and regional authorities, mainly in the EU's neighbouring states.
 Support international peace and stability.

Parliamentary Assembly of the Council of Europe (PACE)

References

External links
 Alliance of Liberals and Democrats for Europe in European Parliament
 Alliance of Liberals and Democrats for Europe in the Committee of the Regions
 Alliance of Liberals and Democrats for Europe in PACE
 EDP official website
 European Liberal Democrat and Reform (ELDR) Party